The 1998 Liga Perdana 1 season is the inaugural season of Liga Perdana 1. A total of 12 teams participated in the season.

The teams were based from 10 best performing teams from 1997 Liga Perdana season. Penang and Olympic 2000 joins the league to complete the 12 teams list after winning the qualifying tournament.

The season kicked off on April 4, 1998. Penang dominated the season and ended up winning the title.

Teams

12 teams competing in the first season of Liga Perdana 1.

 Penang (1998 Liga Perdana 1 champions)
 Pahang
 Brunei
 Kedah
 Sabah
 Sarawak
 Perak
 Kuala Lumpur
 Negeri Sembilan
 Selangor (Relegated to Liga Perdana 2)
 Perlis (Relegated to Liga Perdana 2)
 Olympic 2000 (Relegated to Liga Perdana 2)

League Table:-

1.Penang  - 41 PTS (1998 Liga Perdana 1 Champions)

2.Pahang  - 40 PTS 

3.Brunei  - 35 PTS

4.Kedah  - 34 PTS

5.Sabah  - 31 PTS

6.Sarawak  - 30 PTS

7.Perak  - 29 PTS

8.Kuala Lumpur  - 29 PTS

9.Negeri Sembilan  - 27 PTS

10.Selangor  - 25 PTS (Relegated to Liga Perdana 2)

11.Perlis  - 25 PTS (Relegated to Liga Perdana 2)

12.Olympic 2000  - 18 PTS (Relegated to Liga Perdana 2)

Champions

References

Liga Perdana 1 seasons
1
Malaysia